Orthopodomyia signifera is a species of mosquito in the family Culicidae.

References

signifera
Articles created by Qbugbot
Insects described in 1896